Guadalupe Canseco (born January 25, 1962) is a retired female diver from Mexico. She competed in two consecutive Summer Olympics for her native country, starting in 1980. She claimed a bronze medal in the Women's 10m Platform at the 1983 Pan American Games.

References 

1962 births
Living people
Mexican female divers
Divers at the 1980 Summer Olympics
Divers at the 1984 Summer Olympics
Olympic divers of Mexico
Pan American Games bronze medalists for Mexico
Pan American Games medalists in diving
Divers at the 1983 Pan American Games
Medalists at the 1983 Pan American Games
20th-century Mexican women
21st-century Mexican women